Telia Digital TV is an IPTV distribution platform in Sweden owned by Telia Company. It was launched in January 2005 from a few locations.

In September 2007, Telia announced that the platform had 200,000 subscribers

Previously, Telia owned Com Hem, the largest cable television operator in Sweden, but had to sell it due to competition rules.

Content
The service offers television channels from a number of television broadcasters including Sveriges Television, TV4 AB, SBS Broadcasting Group, Discovery Networks Europe, MTV Networks Europe, Eurosport and NonStop Television. Telia Digital TV also offers Video on Demand services from SF Anytime, Live Networks since September 2005 and TV4 Anytime since June 2007 In March 2008, Telia added Disney Channel On Demand, Discovery Channel On Demand and Animal Planet On Demand to their on demand offerings.

Initially, the channels of Viasat were not included on Telia digital TV as they were only available from their own IPTV platform in collaboration with Bredbandsbolaget. On 23 May 2008, Telia announced an agreement with Viasat that would make six packages of Viasat channels available to Telia customers. It would also make TV3, TV6, TV8 and ZTV available in some of Telia's basic packages The Viasat channels were launched in June 2008 and also included an on demand service In August 2008, SVT Play was added to the platform. Initially, SVT Play on Telia offers newscasts and Olympic broadcasts, but the programme library will be extended over time.

TV channel Lineup
 1. SVT1
 2. SVT2
 3. TV3
 4. TV4
 5. Kanal 5
 6. TV6
 7. TV4 Plus
 8. TV8
 9. Kanal 9
 10. Discovery Channel
 11. MTV
 12. Eurosport
 13. Kanal 11
 14. SVTB/Kunskapskanalen
 15. TV4 Sport
 16. SVT24
 17. SVT HD
 20. Animal Planet
 21. Discovery World
 22. Discovery Science
 23. Discovery Travel & Living
 24. TV4 Fakta
 25. National Geographic Channel
 26. The History Channel
 27. Investigation Discovery
 28. TLC
 29. BBC Knowledge
 30. Viasat History
 31. Viasat Nature/Crime/Playboy TV
 32. Viasat Explorer/Spice
 33. Spice Platinum
 34. Hustler TV
 35. Blue Hustler
 36. FashionTV
 37. Nautical Channel
 40. Canal+ Sport 1
 41. C More Hockey
 42. C More Tennis
 43. Chelsea TV
 44. MUTV
 45. C More Series
 46. C More Hits
 47. C More Action
 48. C More Emotion
 49. C More First
 50. Viasat Film
 52. Viasat Film Family
 53. Viasat Film Action
 54. Viasat Film Nordic
 55. Viasat Film Classic
 56. Viasat Film Comedy
 57. Viasat Film Drama
 58. TCM Nordic
 59. SF-kanalen
 60. TV4 Film
 61. FOX
 62. Silver
 63. Sjuan
 64. TNT
 65. E!
 66. Concert TV
 67. Luxe.tv
 68. CBS Reality
 69. Ginx TV
 70. Eurosport 2
 72. Viasat Fotboll
 73. Viasat Motor
 74. Viasat Sport
 75. Viasat Golf
 76. Viasat Hockey
 77. TV4 Sport
 78. C More Fotboll
 79. C More Kids
 80. Nickelodeon
 81. Cartoon Network
 82. Boomerang
 83. Disney Channel
 84. Disney XD
 85. Disney Junior
 86. CBeebies
 87. Nick Jr.
 88. JimJam
 91. CNN International
 92. BBC World News
 93. BBC Entertainment
 94. BBC Lifestyle
 95. Sky News
 96. euronews
 97. CNBC Nordic
 98. Bloomberg TV
 100. TV400
 101. Star!
 102. VH1
 103. Comedy Central
 104. TV4 Guld
 105. TV4 Komedi
 106. TV4 Fakta XL
 107. TV7 (Sweden)
 108. TV10
 109. TV12
 110  Kanal 10
 111. LifeStyle TV
 112. Axess TV
 113. Kanal Global
 114. Horse1
 115. Travel Channel
 116. VH1 Classic
 150. Säsongskort 1
 151. Säsongskort 2
 152. Säsongskort 3
 153. Säsongskort 4
 154. Säsongskort 5
 200. DR1
 201. DR2
 210. NRK1
 212. TV 2 Norway
 220. YLE TV Mondo
 300. HRT1
 302. TV Polonia
 303. GOD TV
 304. TVE Internacional
 305. TV5Monde
 306. DW-TV
 307. RT
 308. Al Jazeera English
 309. NHK World TV
 310. Wion Tv
 311. PTV World
 312. Australia Plus
 313. Arirang TV
 314. KBS World
 551. OutTV
 777. Telia Nöjeskanalen
 900. 24nt
 901. 24Corren
 902. 24Norrbotten
 903. TV Åre
 999. SVT Regional

External links
 

Digital television
Television in Sweden
2005 establishments in Sweden